Jean Palardy  (1905November 28, 1991) was a French-Canadian painter, art historian, ethnologist and filmmaker.

Biography 
Born in Fitchburg, Massachusetts, Palardy moved with his family to Canada as a child in 1908, one of eight children. He was educated at Collège Saint-Laurent and the séminaire de Sainte-Thérèse, before studying at the École des Beaux-Arts de Montréal. He married painter Jori Smith in 1930.

Palardy and Smith were both members of the League for Social Reconstruction, with his interest in French Canadian rural life influenced by his political beliefs. Artist Jack Humphrey stayed with Palardy and his wife, Jori Smith, while living briefly in Montreal, with the three of them in poverty, supporting themselves during the winter of 1933 by painting matchboxes.

He joined the National Film Board of Canada (NFB) in 1941 and over 19 years directed a number of short films there including The Rising Tide, which was nominated for the Academy Award for Documentary Short Subject at the 22nd Academy Awards.

In 1963, he wrote his influential book on French Canadian design, Les Meubles anciens du Canada français, for which he received a grant from the Canada Council.

Palardy consulted on the restoration of the vessel Grande Hermine as well as that of the Fortress of Louisbourg. In 1975, he started restorations on the Jacques Cartier house. He also consulted for number of museums including the château Ramezay, McCord Museum, Musée national des beaux-arts du Québec and the David M. Stewart Museum.

Filmography

as director 
1947 - 
1949 - The Rising Tide
1951 - Oyster Man
1951 - Îles-de-la-Madeleine 
1952 - The Bird Fancier (L'Homme aux oiseaux)
1954 - Sorel
1954 - Bush Doctor
1954 - Artist in Montreal (On the Spot series)
1955 - Two Countries, One Street
1955 - Soirée de chantiers
1955 - The Lumberjack
1955 - Eye Witness No. 71
1955 - Chantier coopératif
1956 - Designed for Living
1956 - Agronomy
1957 - Carnival in Quebec
1958 - Trans Canada Summer
1959 - Correlieu

as screenwriter 
1949 
1954 Sorel
1954 Bush Doctor
1955 Soirée de chantiers

as cinematographer
1955 Soirée de chantiers
1955 Eye Witness No. 71

as producer 
1955 Soirée de chantiers

Honours 
 Officer, Order of Canada (1967)
 Certificate of merit, Canadian Historical Association (1975)
 Grand Officier, National Order of Quebec (1992, posthumously)

References

External links
 
 Biography, Quebec in Cinema
 Watch films directed by Jean Palardy at the National Film Board of Canada

1905 births
1991 deaths
20th-century Canadian painters
Canadian male painters
Canadian art historians
Film directors from Quebec
National Film Board of Canada people
Officers of the Order of Canada
Grand Officers of the National Order of Quebec
French Quebecers
People from Fitchburg, Massachusetts
École des beaux-arts de Montréal alumni
Canadian ethnologists
Canadian documentary film directors
American emigrants to Canada
20th-century Canadian male artists